The following is a list of pipeline accidents in the United States in 1978. It is one of several lists of U.S. pipeline accidents. See also: list of natural gas and oil production accidents in the United States.

Incidents 

This is not a complete list of all pipeline accidents. For natural gas alone, the Pipeline and Hazardous Materials Safety Administration (PHMSA), a United States Department of Transportation agency, has collected data on more than 3,200 accidents deemed serious or significant since 1987.

A "significant incident" results in any of the following consequences:
 Fatality or injury requiring in-patient hospitalization.
 $50,000 or more in total costs, measured in 1984 dollars.
 Liquid releases of five or more barrels (42 US gal/barrel).
 Releases resulting in an unintentional fire or explosion.

PHMSA and the National Transportation Safety Board (NTSB) post-incident data and results of investigations into accidents involving pipelines that carry a variety of products, including natural gas, oil, diesel fuel, gasoline, kerosene, jet fuel, carbon dioxide, and other substances. Occasionally pipelines are re-purposed to carry different products.

The following incidents occurred during 1978:
 On January 12, a propane pipeline exploded & burned at a pump station, near Conway, Kansas, forcing a nearby highway to be shutdown.
 Earth movement was suspected in causing a gas transmission pipeline to rupture and burn near Stevenson, Washington on January 23. There were no injuries.
 On January 25, a 6-inch gas main ruptured at a weld in Stoughton, Massachusetts, causing gas to migrate under pavement & frozen earth into a building. The building later exploded, killing one person.
 On February 10, a front end loader clearing snow hit a 1-inch gas riser line in Sullivan, Indiana. The gas later exploded in the building, killing 4 people, and destroying the building. 
 On February 15, a gas pipeline being tested with compressed air exploded at a seam on the pipe in Cincinnati, Ohio, injuring 8.
 A portion of the Trans-Alaska Pipeline System pipeline east of Fairbanks, Alaska was ruptured by an explosive device on February 15. Crude oil spilled in a  diameter spot.
 On February 26, a 16-inch Cities Service Gas pipeline ruptured near Lecompton, Kansas, causing natural gas shortages in the area.
 An improperly plugged gas line leaked into a service vault in Oklahoma City, Oklahoma at a shopping center, overcoming 5 gas company workers on March 29. Four of the repairmen died of asphyxiation. None of the repair crew had respirators at the job site.
 On April 7, 2 men were performing maintenance on a town border gas meter in Weimar, Texas when the meter exploded, injuring one of the men. A casting defect in the meter was determined to be the cause of the explosion.
 A gas company crew in Mansfield, Ohio accidentally tied a high pressure gas main into a low pressure gas main on May 17. Much higher gas flames in gas appliances caused damage in 16 homes, and about 2,000 gas meters were shut off during the incident.
 On June 12, a 10-inch gas pipeline was hit by a construction crew in Kansas City, Missouri. Almost 2 hours later, escaping gas ignited, causing burns to 2 men from a crew trying to fix the pipeline leak.
 On August 4, A MAPCO LPG pipeline in Donnellson, Iowa ruptured from past mechanical damage and improper lowering for road improvements. The vapor cloud ignited several minutes after the rupture. Three people were killed and 2 others severely burned. The pipe failed at a dented and gouged area not seen during the original construction, or lowering for road work a few months before. A hydrostatic test on this pipeline after the accident caused failures at 2 other dented & gouged section, and 15 ERW seam failures in 117 miles. The Office of Pipeline Safety later on fined MAPCO $4,000 for the failure.
 On August 7, in Lafayette, Louisiana, natural gas at 15 psig pressure escaped from a corrosion leak in an inactive 1-inch steel service line and migrated beneath a concrete slab and into a building where it ignited. The resulting explosion and fire injured six persons and destroyed the building and its contents.
 On August 14, a coal digging crew in Cairo, Missouri hit a MAPCO LPG pipeline with a backhoe. The gas ignited about 2 hours later, as digging crews were still working nearby. 1 worker was burned, along with the backhoe, a bulldozer, and a diesel fuel tank.
 On August 28, natural gas, which had escaped from a circumferential fracture in a socket heat-fusion coupling on a 2-in. polyethylene (PE) main, operating at 40-psig pressure, migrated beneath a one-story house in Grand Island, Nebraska, exploded, and then burned. One person was injured; the house was destroyed; and three adjacent houses were damaged.
 About 16,000 gallons of gasoline were spilled in Hampton, Pennsylvania on August 30. Workers boring for a sewer line had hit a fuel pipeline. Later, the 2 construction firms responsible were fined only $500 each.
 A pipeline feeding a Strategic Petroleum Reserve storage cavern ruptured in Hackberry, Louisiana on September 22, causing a large fire. 
 A 30-inch United Texas Transmission gas pipeline in Brookside Village, Texas ruptured and exploded, killing five people, and injuring 43 others. Seven mobile homes were also destroyed. The blast was felt 35 miles away. (October 24, 1978)
 On October 30, a pickup truck with 2 women inside drove into an unseen gas cloud from a leaking gas gathering pipeline in Preston, Oklahoma, triggering explosions and a fire, killing the 2 women. 3 homes were also damaged. Flames from the fire reached 200 feet high.
 An Amoco crude oil pipeline leaked into the Farmington Bay Waterfowl Management Area west of Farmington, Utah on November 7. About 105,000 gallons of crude were spilled. The rupture was caused by pumping against a valve that had been closed for earlier pipeline maintenance.

References

Lists of pipeline accidents in the United States